Perennial is the second studio album by Australian folk musician Vera Blue (the first under the name Vera Blue). The album was announced on 15 June 2017, and released on 21 July 2017.

Upon announcement, Vera Blue said: "Perennial is a term for plants that come back year after year, and I like to relate that to memory, feelings and emotions. It's what the record is all about; relationships can be very cyclical, or never-ending, but that isn't necessarily a bad thing. It's just part of life." The album was recorded between Sydney and Los Angeles and is arranged into three chapters which chronologically trace the development of the songwriter.

Vera Blue promoted the album with a national tour across Australia from July to September 2017.

At the J Awards of 2017, the album was nominated for Australian Album of the Year.

Reception

Cameron Adams from the Herald Sun said: "Pavey and her creative partners Andy and Thom Mak fire up a deep house beat, where the bass goes low while Pavey's voice hovers above, detailing how with a few billion humans on the earth she can afford to be choosy. "Magazine" and "Regular Touch" are what you could even call bangers—it's as if Pavey is cutting out the middle man and remixing herself ... and it works."

Annabel Ross from Rolling Stone felt that "There's nothing subdued about the dubby organ chorus on "First Week", or the calamitous, whirring sirens on "Private", and with Andy and Thom Mak producing, it's all reasonably tasteful, if reeking a little of artifice. Pavey's lyrics, meanwhile, are undoubtedly hers. She's been through a breakup and spends a good few tracks singing about it." adding "Pavey needn’t forget that her unvarnished voice has always been her biggest asset."

Haydon Benfield from Renowned for Sound wrote "Pavey hasn’t sought to reinvent the wheel she rolled out with the EP. If anything, she has doubled down on the formula that proved so successful last year", adding "Knowing that her voice is the drawcard, and recognising the value in restraint, Pavey selectively deploys the gorgeous vocal harmonies and layers, and the surprising combinations of these with the music, throughout Perennial."

Ross Maurice from Beat said "While there is a stylistic distinctiveness between individual tracks, the album is cohesive overall. Perennial is an ambitious debut. It follows a narrative of the initial rawness of a relationship which is then transformed into a celebration of renewal and vivacity."

Track listing

Charts

Certifications

Release history

References

2017 albums
Vera Blue albums